Gilf Kebir National Park (GKNP) is a national park located in the remote and hyper-arid New Valley Governorate, Egypt. Established in 2007, it has a surface area of 48533 km2, equal to about 5% of Egypt's territory. GKNP is delimited to the west by Libya and to the south by Sudan. At present there are no human settlements or facilities inside the GKNP.

Ecosystems and cultural values
The park consists of three different ecosystems: the southern ranges of the Great Sand Sea including the Silica glass area, the proper Gilf Kebir plateau and the Egyptian portion of the Gabal El Uweinat massif.

The Great Sand Sea is a large complex of sand dunes extending from the Siwa oasis in the north to the Gilf Kebir in the south. Its south western part is covered by the Silica Glass area, which is scattered with fragments of pure glass, formed about 30 million years ago due to the explosion of a meteorite or comet.

The Gilf Kebir is a plateau, furrowed by immense north trending wadis. The area was settled by a population already at the beginning of the Neolithic area some 9000 years ago during the African humid period, leaving splendid rock paintings and engravings of uncertain age in the wadi Hamra and in the caves of Beasts, Swimmers, Archers and Magharet el Kantara on its southern foothills.

The Gebel Uweinat, situated about 150 km south of the Gilf Kebir and most of which lies in Sudanese and Libyan territories, is another massif important for its abundant rock art.

The presence of humans in the 20th century CE is evidenced by the remains of the Long Range Desert Group WWII-camps such as trucks and an airfield at the Eight Bells spot.

Flora and fauna
The GKNP contains important desert-adapted flora (trees: Acacia raddiana, shrubs: Zilla spinosa, Fagonia thebaica) and fauna (Barbary Sheep).

Gallery

References

Further reading
 Alberto Siliotti, Gilf Kebir national park (Egypt Pocket Guide), .

National parks of Egypt
Protected areas established in 2007
New Valley Governorate